Mercato Saraceno is a comune (municipality) in the Province of Forlì-Cesena in the Italian region Emilia-Romagna, located about  southeast of Bologna and about  southeast of Forlì.

Mercato Saraceno borders the following municipalities: Bagno di Romagna, Cesena, Novafeltria, Roncofreddo, Sarsina, Sogliano al Rubicone, Talamello.

Arnaldo Mussolini (1885-1931), brother of Italian dictator Benito Mussolini, is buried here.

Twin towns
Mercato Saraceno is twinned with:

  Villadossola, Italy, since 2010

References

External links
 Official website

Cities and towns in Emilia-Romagna